Grizelda Kristiņa (née Bertholde; 19 March 1910 – 2 June 2013) was a Livonian and the last speaker of the Livonian language as a mother language. She was born in Vaide within the Bertholds family, relevant in the history of the Livonians. She was a relative of Viktors Bertholds, died in 2009, who for a long time had been believed to be the last speaker of Livonian. After Kristiņa's death, a process for reviving the Livonian language was started.

References

1910 births
2013 deaths
Women centenarians
Latvian centenarians
Livonian people
Last known speakers of a language
Canadian people of Latvian descent